Starr Parodi (born in Los Angeles, California) is a Grammy® award winning pianist, producer, film composer, arranger, music director and former president of The Alliance For Women Film Composers. Parodi won the 2021 Hollywood Music In Media Award for Best Contemporary Classical Composition for her piece Joy Of The Waters (with Amy Andersson/Women Warriors: The Voices Of Change). Parodi has won multiple BMI most performed music awards, Key Art and Telly Awards. In May 2017 Parodi's most recent album "The Heart Of Frida" a cinematic collection of solo piano works inspired by the late legendary artist Frida Kahlo, was awarded ZMR's "Piano Album Of The Year - Solo" by International Radio Broadcasters and "Solo Piano Album Of The Year - Improvised" by SoloPiano.com. Parodi's solo piano recording "Common Places" was awarded Solo Piano Recording of the Year by solopianoradio.com in 2007 and in 2005 she received an RIAA Gold Record for her recording and updated arrangement of the "James Bond Theme".

Composer, producer, arranger and conductor

Parodi, along with her husband/partner Jeff Eden Fair, has composed/produced both themes and underscore for a wide variety of films, film trailers and television shows. A partial list of these projects includes: The Starter Wife - NBC Universal, The Division - Lifetime, G.I. Joe: Renegades - Hasbro, Transformers: Rescue Bots - Hasbro, Bert Stern: Original Madman - Motor Films, The Arsenio Hall Show - Paramount, The Eighteenth Angel - Rysher Films, High Roller: The Stu Ungar Story - New Line Cinema, Maggie - Paramount. Film trailers include: Harry Potter and the Deathly Hallows – Part 1 - Warner Bros., The Last Samurai - Warner Bros., War of the Worlds - Paramount,  GoldenEye - United Artists, Die Another Day - United Artists, Mission: Impossible 2 - Paramount and many others.

The duo also composed the musical theme for the 1990s-era United Artists production logo.

In 2009 Parodi became the first woman composer to have her orchestral work represented nightly at the Pageant of the Masters in Laguna Beach, California with over a quarter million audience members in attendance annually. Parodi is currently a featured composer at The Pageant of the Masters.

Parodi was selected to study with Jerry Goldsmith in his first BMI conducting master class. Starr has passionately conducted ensembles from 5 to 95 pieces in live orchestral, live television and studio recording environments.

Parodi co-produced with Terry Sanders (2x Oscar winner), Mary Ann Cummins and Jeff Eden Fair, Isolde Fair's "To All The Little Girls" music video. She also conducted a live performance of "To All The Little Girls" at Lincoln Center for the 2017 New York Times/Tina Brown - Women In The World Summit, performed by Isolde Fair with an orchestra of young women from The Mannes School and the Renaissance Youth Center Choir.

Parodi is an official Steinway Piano recording and performing artist, she also uses and endorses Korg synthesizers and Steinberg recording software.

Performing musician

In Los Angeles, Parodi found herself playing piano and keyboards in various rock, jazz, gospel and soul bands, teaming up with members of Earth, Wind & Fire, The Temptations, Maze and Parliament-Funkadelic.

Comedian Arsenio Hall invited Starr to play keyboards on his late night show, The Arsenio Hall Show, in the show's house band The Posse. This garnered the young musician her early recognition and led to her performance at the Kennedy Center for the inauguration of President Clinton. Parodi was a featured artist along with Bruce Hornsby, George Duke and Joe Zawinul at Keyboard magazine's 20th anniversary concert (celebrating 20 of the world's top contemporary keyboardists).

Parodi has performed as keyboardist alongside such artists as Mariah Carey, Whitney Houston, Stevie Wonder, Carole King, Carlos Santana, Seal, B.B. King, Ray Charles, Madonna, Celine Dion, Al Green and many others.

Partial discography
Kitt Wakeley: An Adoption Story - 2023 Grammy® Winner - Best Classical Conpendium Album
Women Warriors: The Voices Of Change - 2022 Grammy® Winner - Best Classical Conpendium Album
The Storied Life Of A.J. Fikry - Original Soundtrack
Carole King: A Holiday Carole - Deluxe Edition - 2013
Carole King: A Holiday Carole - 2011
piano on "Lo, How a Rose E'er Blooming"
Bert Stern: The Original Mad Man - 2013 (score only album)
Callaghan: Callaghan - 2018
Callaghan: Skin On Skin - 2018
Callaghan: The Other Side - 2017
Bert Stern: The Original Mad Man - 2013 (soundtrack/score album)
The Other Side Of OK - 2020 (single)
I Sama Bili - 2020 (single)
When Doves Cry - 2019 (single) with Louis Price
Lucciola - 2020 (single)
Bay Of Silence - 2021 (single)

The Heart Of Frida - 2016 
"The Heart Of Frida"
"When Doves Cry"
"The Elephant And The Dove"
"Rancho Hamilton"
"Hardly Touching"
"Overture Of Color"
"Nights In White Satin"
"Don't Be Discouraged"
"Sun & Life" 
"The Lightness Of Frida"
"Hope"

Common Places: Piano Improvisations - 2006 (SoloPianoRadio.com CD Of The Year 2007)
"Common Places"
"For What It's Worth"
"Albinoni's Adagio"
"Kenya"
"We Are Here"
"Follow Me"
"James Bond Theme"
"Forgiveness"
"Let It Be" 
"Covenant"

The Best of Bond... James Bond - 2002 (RIAA Gold Record)
"James Bond Theme"

Change - 1991
"Change" - 4:33
"Something of Value" - 5:15
"Kenya" - 5:20
"Superstition" - 5:37
"Serengeti Trail" - 6:27
"The Honor System" - 4:41
"Forever" - 3:27
"Joyful" - 6:09
"Covenant" - 6:31
"Change" (Reprise) - 1:16

Personal

Parodi is married to Jeff Eden Fair and together they have a daughter, Isolde Maria Parodi Fair. Parodi is the daughter of geothermal energy pioneer Roy Parodi and his wife Marcella Starr Parodi. Parodi is the step daughter of Margarita Henkel, Roy Parodi's first wife. Margarita Henkel is regarded by many as the namesake for the Margarita (cocktail).

References

External links

Living people
American film score composers
21st-century American composers
American keyboardists
Year of birth missing (living people)
American women film score composers
21st-century American women musicians
20th-century American composers
20th-century American women musicians
20th-century women composers
21st-century women composers